The League of caucuses on Christian Historical foundation in the province of Friesland (in Dutch: Bond van Kiesvereenigingen op Christelijk-Historischen grondslag in de provincie Friesland, informally called Frisian League or Friesche Bond) is a Dutch conservative Reformed political party. The Frisian League is historically linked to the Christian Democratic Appeal, which is currently one of the major parties of the Netherlands.

Party history
The Frisian League was founded on 24 March 1898 by the reformed minister Hoedemaker. It was founded as one of several parties that were founded in the 1890s, which all turned again the leadership and ideology of Abraham Kuyper, the leader of the Protestant Anti Revolutionary Party. Kuyper had initiated a new political course for Protestantism in the Netherlands, which included cooperation with the Catholics, in the coalition, strategical support for extension of suffrage a rejection of theocracy in favour of a specific conception of state neutrality, sphere sovereignty and a strong party organization and party discipline. The party also rejected the split of the Reformed Churches in the Netherlands from the Dutch Reformed Church.

The party won one seat (Harlingen) in the 1901 elections, which was taken by the minister Schoking. It held its one seat in the 1905 elections. In 1908 the party merged with the Christian Historical Party to found the Christian Historical Union.

Name
The rather complicated name of the party League of caucuses on Christian Historical foundation in the province of Friesland was chosen to convey several things: the party was not a centralized party with party discipline, instead it was a league of local caucuses; the term Christian Historical was used before 1898 to denote supporters of the main Protestant party, the Anti Revolutionary Party, emphasizing the Protestant nature of the history of the Netherlands; and finally the only representatives of the party came from Friesland, although it also had branches in South Holland.

Ideology & issues
The Frisian League was a conservative Protestant party. It saw government as a god-given institution, which should act according to biblical norms. Society should furthermore follow its historical course. Power should not be based on the opinion of the majority but on authority. The most important issue for the party was the increasing neutrality of the state and the acceptance of Catholicism. The party advocated a Protestant theocracy and was strong anti-papist. Furthermore, the party opposed general suffrage.

Representation
This table shows the Frisian League's results elections to the House of Representatives and Senate, as well as the party's political leadership: the fractievoorzitter. It also possible that the party leader is member of cabinet, if the League was part of the governing coalition, the "highest ranking"  minister is listed.

Electorate
The electorate of the Frisian League was mainly constituted by adherents of the Dutch Reformed Church from the upper class. Its support was heavily regionalized in Friesland.

International comparison
As a party for Protestant dissenters of a catholic-Protestant alliance the Frisian League is a unique phenomenon in international perspective. Its political course, which included support of limited government, rejection of universal suffrage and hostility against Catholicism, is comparable to the course of the British Conservative Party in the late 1800s and to some extent American Party of the United States.

References

Protestant political parties
Defunct Christian political parties
Defunct political parties in the Netherlands
Confessional parties in the Netherlands
Conservative parties in the Netherlands
Regionalist parties in the Netherlands
Political parties established in 1898
Political parties disestablished in 1908
1898 establishments in the Netherlands
History of Friesland
Politics of Friesland
Politics of South Holland